Plymouth is a small rural community in Pictou County, Nova Scotia, Canada. It is located approximately 3 km south of the town of New Glasgow.  It stretches along Route 348 situated on the east bank of the East River of Pictou, opposite the town of Stellarton.

Now largely dominated by mixed farming and near-urban sprawl, Plymouth is home to the site of the Westray Mine. A methane gas explosion in the mine on May 9, 1992, which killed 26 miners, placed Plymouth in the international media spotlight for almost a week during the failed rescue efforts, with the local community centre, opposite the mine site, becoming a symbol of the area.

References

Communities in Pictou County
Mining communities in Nova Scotia